Melanie Faisst (Melanie Faißt), born 12 February 1990 in Titisee-Neustadt is a German ski jumper. Her World Cup debut was on 3 December 2011 in Lillehammer, Norway where she was on the third place.

References

1990 births
Living people
German female ski jumpers
People from Breisgau-Hochschwarzwald
Sportspeople from Freiburg (region)
21st-century German women